Flirt is a 1983 Italian-French drama film directed by Roberto Russo. It was entered into the 34th Berlin International Film Festival where Monica Vitti won the Silver Bear for an outstanding single achievement.

Plot
Giovanni (Jean-Luc Bideau) and Laura (Monica Vitti) are a well-matched pair: brilliant real estate agent she and a good electronic technician him. Giovanni makes the extraordinary and often sleep pronounce a name: Veronica. Suspicious, Laura the pawn to discover that Giovanni has a lover ... imaginary. The man, in fact, suffering from hallucinations and it will take a long time, a lot of patience and a bit of cunning, to bring him to reason.

Cast
 Jean-Luc Bideau as Giovanni Landini
 Monica Vitti as Laura
 Alessandro Haber as Amerigo
 Marina Confalone
 Eros Pagni
 Monica Pariante
 Marco Piemonte
 Giacomo Piperno
 Giovanni Russo
 Deddi Savagnone
 Vincenzo Spitaleri
 Franco Trevisi

References

External links

1983 films
1980s Italian-language films
1983 drama films
Italian drama films
French drama films
1980s French films
1980s Italian films